Gaatho is a 2016 Nepalese psychological thriller art film directed by Suraj Bhusal and produced by Tilak Bahadur Chhetri. The film stars Najir Hussain, Abhaya Baral and Namrata Shrestha.

Plot
Gaatho is about an artist with bipolar disorder and social phobia

Cast
Najir Hussain
Namrata Shrestha
Abhay Baral

Crew

Story/Director:  Suraj Bhusal
Producer: Tilak Bahadur Chettri, Suraj Bhusal
Co-Producer: Nripendra Raj Joshi
Director of Photography: Narendra Mainali
Editor: Nimesh Shrestha  
 Screenplay & Dialogue: Suraj Bhusal, Pratik Gurung
Make-up: Nima Lama
Music / Lyrics/Singer : Anupam Sharma 
Background Score: Jason Kunwar

Tracks

References

Nepalese thriller films